Heliveh castle is a historical castle, located in Abdanan County in Ilam Province, dating back to the Sasanian Empire.

References 

Castles in Iran
Sasanian castles